The men's 52 kg weightlifting competitions at the 1976 Summer Olympics in Montreal took place on 18 July at the St. Michel Arena. It was the second appearance of the flyweight class.

Results

References

Weightlifting at the 1976 Summer Olympics